Jodie Evans (born September 22, 1954) is an American political activist, author, and documentary film producer.

Evans served in the cabinet of California Governor Jerry Brown and managed his 1992 campaign for the presidency. Evans co-founded the women's anti-war activist organization Code Pink with Medea Benjamin and others. She is the board chair of the Rainforest Action Network.

Early life
Evans was born and raised in Las Vegas, Nevada. She first became interested in social justice activism when she worked as a maid in a major Las Vegas hotel as a teenager—as her coworkers organized, she marched in favor of a living wage.

Activism
Her CODEPINK protest actions include disrupting Sarah Palin's speech at the 2008 Republican National Convention, and a 2009 protest in Santa Monica against Israeli cosmetics company Ahava. Upon returning from Afghanistan, she delivered signatures from women in that country and the US to President Barack Obama asking him to send no new troops into the conflict there.

In March, 2010, during a book signing by Karl Rove, she and other Code Pink members caused disruptions. At one point, Evans charged the stage towards Rove with a pair of handcuffs, declaring that she was making a citizen's arrest. On January 30, 2011, Evans was arrested for disruptive behavior at a Rancho Mirage hotel where she was leading a protest against David H. Koch and Charles G. Koch over their financial support of part of the Tea Party Movement.

She is the co-founder and president of the People’s Support Foundation, a non-profit which was established in 2017 with support of former staff of software company ThoughtWorks.

In 2019, Evans joined actress and activist Jane Fonda in a series of weekly rallies and acts of civil disobedience, called Fire Drill Fridays, at Washington DC's Capitol to highlight the global climate crisis, where Evans was arrested on multiple occasions along with Fonda.

She was an editor of the books Twilight of Empire: Responses to Occupation (2004) (Co-Editor) and Stop the Next War Now: Effective Responses to Violence and Terrorism (2005) (Co-Editor).

Personal life
She was married to Max Palevsky until his death on May 5, 2010. Shecurrently lives in Venice, California. Evans' partner is tech entrepreneur Neville Roy Singham.

Controversies
In the summer of 2010, controversy arose over Evans' alleged 2008 remark to Debbie Lee, the mother of an American soldier killed in Iraq that "Your son deserved to die in Iraq if he was stupid enough to go over there." Republican candidate Meg Whitman repeated this charge in her 2010 California gubernatorial campaign, demanding that Jerry Brown return money from a fundraiser that Evans hosted. Later during the controversy, Lee told the San Francisco Chronicle that she could not identify Evans and was not sure who made the insulting remark.

Films
 Stripped and Teased: Tales from Las Vegas Women (1999) (Producer)
 The Ground Truth: After the Killing Ends (2006) (Executive Producer)
 South Central Farm: Oasis in a Concrete Desert (2008) (Executive Producer)
 The Most Dangerous Man in America: Daniel Ellsberg and the Pentagon Papers (2009) (Executive Producer)
 The People Speak (2009) (Producer)
 Rooted in Peace (2012) (Self)
 The Square (2013) (Executive Producer)
 Gore Vidal: The United States of Amnesia (2013) (Self)
 We Are Many (2014)
 The Yes Men Are Revolting (2014)
 The Brainwashing of My Dad (2015) (Executive Producer)
 This Changes Everything (2015) (Executive Producer)
 Shadow World (2016) (Co-Executive Producer)
 Always in Season (2019) (Co-Executive Producer)

Organizations and boards 
Evans is a member of a number of organizations and boards including:
 CODEPINK: Women for Peace (Co-founder)
 California Arts Council
 The People's Forum      
 Drug Policy Alliance
 Rainforest Action Network
 Institute for Policy Studies
 World Festival of Sacred Music
 826LA
 Office of the Americas
 Sisterhood is Global Institute
 Women's Media Center
 Global Girl Media
 Schumacher Center for a New Economics

Awards
 Levantine Cultural Center 2010 East-West Vision of Peace Award 
 Progressive Democrats of the Santa Monica Mountains 2008 Tedi Winograd Courage Award - Outside the Party 
 Death Penalty Focus 2007 Rose Elizabeth Bird Commitment to Justice Award

See also
 United for Peace and Justice
 List of peace activists

References 

1954 births
American anti-war activists
American documentary filmmakers
American women's rights activists
Living people
People from the Las Vegas Valley
American women documentary filmmakers